Sue Galloway is an American actress, comedian, and screenwriter. An Upright Citizens Brigade Theatre alumna and teacher, she is best known for playing Sue Laroche-Van der Hout on the NBC sitcom 30 Rock. Since 2002, Galloway has been an active member of the longtime Upright Citizens Brigade (UCB) troupe.

Career
In 2002, Galloway enrolled in the Upright Citizens Brigade Theatre in New York City as a sketch comedy student. While there, fellow UCB comedian, Anthony Atamanuik, submitted Galloway's name to NBC producers looking to hire a female extra for the upcoming television series 30 Rock. She was originally hired to play "Girl Writer": a staff writer with no lines and occasional reaction shots. By season three, Galloway's role was developed into a scene-stealing, "French-Dutch" character named Sue LaRoche-Van der Hout.

Galloway has performed in live theater, television commercials, and film. She created and performed in a one-woman show called POSE Magazine and has produced and starred in various web series and shorts with fellow actress and comedian Pam Murphy. Galloway was a freelance writer for Weekend Update on Saturday Night Live.

Galloway currently performs weekly with the UCB improvisational sketch comedy group The Law Firm. "This is what I was born to do," said Galloway.

Personal life
Galloway grew up in Malvern, Pennsylvania.  She graduated from the University of Pittsburgh and the Actors Studio Drama School. Galloway is married to former Saturday Night Live writer and 30 Rock co-star John Lutz, with whom she has two children. 

Comedy influences cited by Galloway include Carol Burnett, Amy Poehler, Betty White, and Phil Hartman.

Filmography

Acting

Writing

Producing

References

External links
  on YouTube
 
 New York Magazine: Sue Galloway Articles

Living people
Year of birth missing (living people)
People from Malvern, Pennsylvania
Comedians from Pennsylvania
Actresses from Pennsylvania
American women comedians
21st-century American comedians
American television actresses
American film actresses
21st-century American actresses
American women television writers
21st-century American screenwriters